Cemophora coccinea, commonly known as the scarlet snake, is a species of nonvenomous snake in the family Colubridae. The species is native to the southeastern United States. There are two subspecies of C. coccinea that are recognized as being valid. The Texas scarlet snake (C. lineri) was previously considered a subspecies.

Description
The scarlet snake is relatively small, growing to a total length (including tail) of 14-26 inches (36–66 cm) at adult size. The dorsal pattern consists of a light gray ground color, with a series of black-bordered red, white or yellow blotches down the back. The belly is either a uniform light gray or white color. The dorsal blotches can extend down the sides of the body, appearing somewhat like banding or rings, which sometimes leads to confusion with other sympatric species such as the venomous coral snakes or the harmless scarlet king snake.

Geographic distribution
C. coccinea is found only in the United States, in southeastern Texas, eastern Oklahoma, Arkansas, parts of Louisiana, Mississippi, Alabama, Georgia, Florida, South Carolina, North Carolina, Tennessee, Kentucky, Illinois, Indiana, Virginia, Maryland, and Delaware; with disjunct populations in New Jersey and central Missouri. The species is more commonly found throughout most of the Atlantic coastal plain areas. They prefer open forested areas with sandy soil, ground litter, and organic debris.

In Indiana, the scarlet snake is listed as an endangered species. In New Jersey, the scarlet snake has been recommended by the New Jersey Endangered and Nongame Advisory Committee that it be put on the threatened status for this species within the state, but no formal rule proposal has been filed to date. The Threatened status is largely due to population declines and habitat loss. Reasons for the decline in their population are a loss of habitat, illegal capture for the pet trade, road mortality, and direct killing.

Behavior and diet
The scarlet snake is nocturnal and is active only during the summer months. They can be found during the day beneath logs, under pine debris or other organic litter. At night they are often seen crossing roads, setting out to look for food. C. coccineas  diet consists of lizards, small rodents, the  eggs of snakes lizards and turtles, and other snakes. Their large, very sharp posterior teeth are used to slash open large reptile eggs. The snake will either squeeze an egg to expel its contents or thrust its head into the egg to break it open. The smallest reptile eggs are eaten in their entirety.

Reproduction
There is very little known about the reproductive habits of the scarlet snake. It is oviparous, generally laying 2-9 eggs per clutch, with the typical clutch yielding five eggs. Breeding occurs throughout the spring months, and eggs are laid throughout the summer in burrows or under rocks. The eggs hatch two months after breeding, typically in the late summer or autumn.

Predators and defense
The natural predators of the scarlet snake are snake-eating snakes such as the coral snake, and predatory birds and mammals. Scarlet snakes rarely bite when picked up by humans, although they can release a foul-smelling odor.

Conservation
The two greatest threats that scarlet snakes face are the destruction of their habitats because of commercial development and the rising rate of road mortality. Other threats are illegal capture of the species for the pet trade and intentional killing.

Subspecies
The following two subspecies are recognized as being valid.
Cemophora coccinea coccinea  – Florida scarlet snake
Cemophora coccinea copei  – northern scarlet snake

Nota bene: A trinomial authority in parentheses indicates that the subspecies was originally described in a genus other than Cemophora.

References

Further reading
Behler JL, King FW (1979). The Audubon Society Field Guide to North American Reptiles and Amphibians. New York: Alfred A. Knopf. 743 pp. . (Cemophora coccinea, pp. 592–593 + Plates 595, 596, 607).
Blumenbach JF (1788). "Einige Naturhistorische Bemerkungen bey Gelegenheit einer Schweizer-Reise". Magazin für das Neueste aus der Physik und Naturgeschichte 5''': 13–24. (Coluber coccineus, new species, p. 11). (in German and Latin).
Conant R (1975). A Field Guide to Reptiles and Amphibians of Eastern and Central North America, Second Edition. The Peterson Field Guide Series. Boston: Houghton Mifflin. xviii + 429 pp. + Plates 1-48.  (hardcover);  (paperback). (Cemophora coccinea, pp. 211–212 + Plates 30, 31 + Map 152).
Conant R, Bridges W (1939). What Snake Is That?: A Field Guide to the Snakes of the United States East of the Rocky Mountains. (with 108 drawings by Edmond Malnate). New York and London: D. Appleton-Century. Frontispiece map + viii + 163 pp. + Plates A-C, 1-32. (Cemophora coccinea, pp. 85–86 + Plate 26, Figure 78).
Powell R, Conant R, Collins JT (2016). Peterson Field Guide to Reptiles and Amphibians of Eastern and Central North America, Fourth Edition. Boston and New York: Houghton Mifflin Harcourt. xiv + 494 pp., 207 Figures, 47 Plates.  . (Cemophora coccinea, pp. 367–368 + Figure 159 on p. 330 + Plates 32, 44). 
Schmidt KP, Davis DD (1941). Field Book of Snakes of the United States and Canada. New York: G.P. Putnam's Sons. 365 pp. (Cemophora coccinea, pp. 193–194, Figure 60).
Smith HM, Brodie ED Jr (1982). Reptiles of North America: A Guide to Field Identification. New York: Golden Press. 240 pp.  (paperback). (Cemophora coccinea, pp. 178–179).
Stejneger L, Barbour T (1917). A Check List of North American Amphibians and Reptiles. Cambridge, Massachusetts: Harvard University Press. 125 pp. (Cemophora coccinea, p. 91).
Wright AH, Wright AA (1957). Handbook of Snakes of the United States and Canada. Ithaca and London: Comstock. 1,105 pp. (in two volumes) (Cemophora coccinea, pp. 111–115, Figure 36, Map 13).
Zim HS, Smith HM (1956). Reptiles and Amphibians: A Guide to Familiar American Species. A Golden Nature Guide. New York: Simon and Schuster. 160 pp. (Scarlet snake, Cemophora doliata'', pp. 100, 156).

External links 

South Carolina Snake Species: Scarlet Snake
Florida Museum of Natural History: Florida Scarlet Snake
Florida Museum of Natural History: Northern Scarlet Snake

Cemophora
Snakes of North America
Reptiles described in 1788
Taxa named by Johann Friedrich Blumenbach
Fauna of the Southeastern United States